Otricoli is a town and comune in the province of Terni, Umbria, central Italy. It is located on the Via Flaminia, near the east bank of the Tiber, some 70 km north of Rome and 20 km south of Narni.

History 

Anciently named Ocriculum, the Umbrian city concluded an alliance with Rome in 308 BC. The modern village lies on the site of the ancient town  about two km north of the Roman relocation, which was moved down from the defensible position probably at the end of the Republican era, in order to be closer to the curve of the Tiber and the Via Flaminia, which crossed the river here to enter Umbria. Its river port was the "oil port", signalling the olive culture that supported its economy. A pensor lignarius ("weigher of wood") noted in a recently unearthed inscription, identifies a trade in timber and perhaps firewood (Soprintendenza per i Beni Culturali).

Main sights
Excavations on the Roman site in 1775 and following years led to the discovery of the baths, a theatre, a basilica and other buildings. In the baths were found a number of works of art, now in the Vatican, including the mosaic pavement of the Sala della Rotonda, Museo Pio-Clementino, and the celebrated head of Zeus and the head of Claudius, both also shown in the Sala della Rotonda.

A badly-eroded amphitheatre is still visible, but the other buildings have in the main been covered up again. Lack of consistent archaeological investigation has left the layout and extent of the Roman site unclear, though many works of art have been removed. Some finds are shown in the Antiquarium on the site.

References

Sources

External links
Official website
Bella Umbria: Ocriculum
Soprintendenza per i Beni Culturali, Otricoli - Parco archeologico

Hilltowns in Umbria